Iwao (written: 巖, 巌, 岩夫, 岩尾, 岩生, 岩男 or 岩雄) is both a masculine Japanese given name and a Japanese surname. Notable people with the name include:

Surname
Emma Haruka Iwao, Japanese computer scientist and cloud developer advocate
, Japanese voice actress and singer
, Japanese footballer
, Japanese field hockey player
, Japanese academic, historian and writer
, Japanese psychologist, magazine editor and academic

Given name
, Japanese cross-country skier
, Japanese printmaker
, Japanese diplomat
, Japanese boxer
, Japanese sport wrestler
, Japanese politician
, Japanese general
, Japanese ice hockey player
, Japanese field marshal
, Japanese academic
Iwao Takamoto (1925–2007), Japanese-American animator, television producer and film director
, Japanese footballer
, Japanese photographer

Fictional characters
, a character in the manga series Kinnikuman

Japanese-language surnames
Japanese masculine given names